Elias Motsoaledi Local Municipality (formerly Greater Groblersdal Local Municipality) is located in the Sekhukhune District Municipality of Limpopo province, South Africa. The seat of Elias Motsoaledi Local Municipality is Groblersdal. Municipality is named in honour of the Elias Motsoaledi.

Main places
The 2001 census divided the municipality into the following main places:

Politics 
The municipal council consists of sixty-one members elected by mixed-member proportional representation. Thirty-one councillors are elected by first-past-the-post voting in thirty-one wards, while the remaining thirty are chosen from party lists so that the total number of party representatives is proportional to the number of votes received. In the election of 3 August 2016, the African National Congress (ANC) won a majority of forty-one seats on the council.
The following table shows the results of the election.

References

External links 
 Official homepage

Local municipalities of the Sekhukhune District Municipality